Wells is a census-designated place (CDP) in the town of Wells, Hamilton County, New York, United States. It is within the Adirondack Park.

Geography
The community is in the southern part of the town of Wells, in southeastern Hamilton County, surrounding Lake Algonquin on the Sacandaga River. The CDP extends south as far as the West Branch of the Sacandaga. New York State Route 30 passes through the center of the community, leading north  to Speculator and south  to Northville.

Demographics

References

Census-designated places in New York (state)
Census-designated places in Hamilton County, New York
Adirondacks